The following squads and players competed in the World Women's Handball Championship in 1997 in Germany.

Algeria 

 Houda Benachi
 Samia Saidji
 Samia Boukais
 Dahbia Mehanek
 Nbila Chibani
 Lynda Cherik 
 Nadjia Attafene 
 Feriel Amoura 
 Aicha Kouta
 Nadre Aouka 
 Karima Toudjine 
 Ouafa Mekaissi 
 Feriel Choukri 
 Fathia Neggazi

Angola 

 Maria Vanga
 Justina Jose Joaquim Lopez Praca
 Anica Miguel Joao Neto 
 Ilda Maria Bengue 
 Felisbela Teixeira 
 Filomena Jose Trindade 
 Maria Teresa Neto Joaquim 
 Teresa Ulundo
 Elisa Webba 
 Ivone Mufuca
 Maria Cordeiro
 Teresa Moco
 Palmira Barbosa 
 Maria Ines Jololo 
 Domingas Cordeiro

Austria 

 Sylvia Kundt
 Tatjana Dschandschgawa
 Rima Sypkus 
 Stephanie Ofenböck
 Doris Meltzer
 Sorina Lefter 
 Barbara Strass
 Magda Materzok
 Edith Mika
 Sylvia Strass
 Laura Fritz
 Stanka Božović
 Iris Morhammer 
 Renata Cieloch

Belarus 

 Natallia Petrakova
 Marina Bratenkova
 Raissa Tikhonovich 
 Alla Vaskova 
 Natallia Sysoyeva
 Larysa Mezhinskaya
 Antonia Tchibangou 
 Irina Tchernevskaia
 Tatjana Doudkina
 Natallia Tsvirko
 Tatsiana Silitch 
 Tatjana Karovina 
 Elena Korzun 
 Svetlana Minevskaia

Brazil 

 Cristina Silva
 Nivia Da Cruz
 Rose Silva 
 Soraya Da Silva 
 Maria De Sales 
 Margarete Lobo Montao
 Dilane Azambuja Roese 
 Veronica Gomes 
 Vanessa Veiga 
 Valeria De Oliveira 
 Idalina Borges Mesquita 
 Sandra De Oliveira

Canada 

 Marie-Claude Gibeau
 Sharon Deir
 France Brunet 
 Fabienne Raphael 
 Cyndie Drolet
 Nancy Karpinsky
 Héléne Gravel
 Amélie Champagne
 Dominique Boivin 
 Julie Hébert
 Caroline Pilon 
 Véronique Mongrain 
 Mirjana Jurcic 
 Nathalie Brochu 
 Caroline Coté

China 

 Xiajiong Wang
 Ge Li Yu
 Bing Li
 Li Zhang
 Lie Chen 
 Zhihong Che
 Yan Xia Cong
 Chao Zhai
 Cailing Xu
 Jianfang Li
 Wei Shi 
 Hai Yun Chen 
 Geng Zhang 
 Ji Chen

Croatia 

 Ana Maljko
 Barbara Jovicic
 Moira Botica
 Klaudija Klikovac-Bubalo 
 Marija Celina 
 Samira Hasagic 
 Renata Pavlacic
 Natasa Kolega 
 Helena Lulic
 Vesna Horacek
 Vlatka Mihoci 
 Djana Ivandija
 Renata Damjanic 
 Snjezana Petika 
 Bozica Greguric

Czech Republic 

 Lenka Cerna
 Marketa Myslivcova
 Zuzana Pospisilova 
 Erika Koberova 
 Renata Cileckova 
 Monika Ludmilova 
 Lenka Romanova 
 Jarmila Majickova
 Gabriela Korandova
 Petra Valova
 Marie Libanska 
 Nadezda Krejcirikova
 Petra Cumplova 
 Gabriela Bartuskova
 Jana Arnosova

Denmark

France 
 Valérie Nicolas (GK)
  (GK)
 
 
 Sandrine Mariot Delerce
  (GK)
 Véronique Pecqueux
 Nathalie Selambarom
 Leila Duchemann
 Nodjialem Myaro 
 Myriam Korfanty 
 Stéphanie Cano 
 Isabelle Wendling 
 Chantal Maio
 Stéphanie Ludwig

Germany 

 Michaela Schanze
 Emilia Luca
 Manuela Fiedel
 Anna Osiakowska
 Sandra Polchow
 Christine Lindemann 
 Miroslava Ritskiavitchius 
 Grit Jurack 
 Annika Schafferus
 Silvia Schmitt 
 Michaela Erler 
 Kathrin Blacha
 Franziska Heinz 
 Yvonne Karrasch
 Heike Schmidt 
 Agnieszka Tobiasz

Hungary 

 Andrea Farkas
 Anikó Meksz
 Melinda Tóth-Szabó
 Anita Kulcsár
 Ildikó Pádár
 Gabriella Takács
 Helga Németh
 Beatrix Balogh
 Ágnes Farkas
 Éva Erdős
 Rita Borók
 Zsófia Pásztor
 Fanni Kenyeres
 Rita Deli
 Katalin Pálinger
 Anikó Kántor

Ivory Coast 

 Elisabeth Kouassi
 Emma Marcelle Negle
 Alimata Dosso
 Aimée Candide Zanzan
 Adéline Koudou
 Elizabeth Fawon Sokouri
 Tapé Catherine Sery
 Laurette Bodoua 
 Sidonie Lourougnon 
 Etche Philomène Koko 
 Marie-Ange Gogbe 
 Wandou Guchi
 Adélaide Tibe
 Paula Arlette Gondo 
 Alice Koudougnon 
 Celine Affoua Dongo

Japan 

 Michiko Yamashita
 Ayako Yamaguchi
 Keiko Tamura 
 Akane Aoto
 Emiko Kamide 
 Emi Matsumoto
 Nana Sugihara 
 Mineko Tanaka 
 Miyoko Tanaka 
 Kanako Tsuji 
 Yumiko Tanaka
 Mie Fujiura
 Hitomi Sakugawa

Macedonia 

 Gordana Naceva
 Oksana Maslova
 Ljubica Georgievska 
 Biljana Naumoska
 Marina Abramova 
 Mileva Velkova 
 Mirjana Čupić
 Nadja Tasci 
 Indira Kastratović 
 Dana Filipovska
 
 Larisa Kiselyova 
 Klara Boeva

Norway 

 Heidi Tjugum
 Jeanette Nilsen
 Tonje Larsen 
 Janne Tuven 
 Susann Goksør Bjerkrheim 
 Kari Solem Aune 
 Sahra Hausmann 
 Hege Kvitsand
 Mette Davidsen 
 Trine Haltvik 
 Ellen Mitchell
 Annette Tveter
 Lise Kristiansen
 Tonje Sagstuen 
 Monica Vik Gabrielsen

Poland 

 Iwona Pabich
 Izabela Czapko
 Monika Studzinska
 Agata Szukielowicz
 Monika Wicha
 Aleksandra Pawelska 
 Anna Garwacka 
 Katarzyna Szklarczuk
 Sabina Soja 
 Agnieszka Beata Matuszewska 
 Joanna Jurkiewicz 
 Renata Zukiel 
 Justyna Sebrala
 Sylwia Pociecha

Romania 

 Carmen Petca
 Mihaela Ciobanu
 Valeria Motogna
 Simona Gogirla
 Olimpia Veres
 Elena Iorgu 
 Mariana Tirca 
 Luminita Stroe 
 Mihaela Apostol 
 Alina-Ileana Jula 
 Alina Nicoleta Dobrin
 Lacramioara Lazar 
 Roxana Stanisor
 Steluta Lazar 
 Magdalena Urdea

Russia 

 Stella Vartanian
 Natalia Gritsenko
 Tatiana Berezniak 
 Natalya Deriouguina 
 Liudmila Bodnieva
 Irina Akhromeeva 
 Raissa Verakso 
 Olga Evtcherenko 
 Ludmila Chevtchenko 
 Irina Kalinitchenko 
 Zhanna Sabadash 
 Natalia Malakhova 
 Svetlana Smirnova

Slovenia 

 Mojca Brezova
 Sergeja Stefanisin
 Mojca Dercar
 Natasa Mezek
 Marjeta Marton
 Darja Skopelja
 Sonia Zidar
 Branka Mijatovic
 Deja Doler 
 Anja Freser 
 Tatjana Oder 
 Simona Sturm 
 Katja Kurent
 Irma Kapidzic 
 Tina Randl 
 Andreja Verbinc

South Korea 

 Young-Ran Oh
 Nam-Soo Lee
 Hye-Jeong Kwag
 Soung-Yeol Oh
 Soon-Ja Cho 
 Rang Kim 
 Eun-Gyung Kim 
 Eun-Mi Kim
 Hyun-Ok Kim 
 Hyang-Ok Kim 
 Choeng-Shim Kim 
 Jeong-Ho Hong 
 Sun-Hee Han 
 Soon-Young Huh
 Sang-Eun Lee

Uruguay 

 Elena Salgado
 Alejandra Varela
 Silvana Renom
 Marcela Schelotto
 Isabel Crocci
 Maria Cecilia Del Campo 
 Silvana De Armas 
 Gabriela Sebasti 
 Mercedes Amor 
 M. Jose Del Campo
 Sabrina Mujica 
 Cecilia Lapetina 
 Lorena Estefanell
 Lucia Curbello
 Sofia Griot

Uzbekistan 

 Irina Skulkova
 Olga Suslina 
 Anna Zikova 
 Nadezhda Kelasyeva
 Tatjana Firsova 
 Aziza Abzalova 
 Irina Voronova
 Olga Atilina
 Elena Vasilenko 
 Viktoria Jorjoladze 
 Olga Adjiderskaya

References 

World Women's Handball Championship squads
World Handball Championship squads